King Si of Zhou, personal name  Ji Shu, was the 30th king of the Chinese Zhou dynasty and the 18th of Eastern Zhou.

He gained the throne in 441 BC by killing his older brother King Ai of Zhou, but he was then killed by his younger brother King Kao of Zhou after only five months of rule.

Ancestry

See also
Family tree of ancient Chinese emperors

References

Year of birth missing
441 BC deaths
Zhou dynasty kings
5th-century BC Chinese monarchs
5th-century BC murdered monarchs
Assassinated Chinese politicians